Hornby Lighthouse, also known as South Head Lower Light or South Head Signal Station, is a heritage-listed active lighthouse located on the tip of South Head, New South Wales, Australia, a headland to the north of the suburb Watsons Bay. It marks the southern entrance to Port Jackson and Sydney Harbour, as well as lighting the South Reef, a ledge of submerged rocks. It is the third oldest lighthouse in New South Wales. Designed by Mortimer Lewis and listed on the (now defunct) Register of the National Estate and on the New South Wales State Heritage Register since 2 April 1999, with the following statement of significance:

History 

The need for a lighthouse at the entrance of Jackson Bay was made evident by the loss of two ships. First was the Dunbar, wrecked in August 1857, with the loss of 121 lives. The second was Catherine Adamson, two months later in October 1857, with a loss of twenty-one lives. The first signal station was operated close to the present site in 1790, serving as a landmark for ships to communicate their arrival to the settlement. A committee of the Light, Pilot and Navigation Board took evidence in September 1857 and recommended the construction of a  lighthouse on the inner South Head, showing a fixed white light (F.W.), although a red light was also considered.

The South Head Signal Station is a dominant Sydney landmark which appears to have been in continuous use since the 1840s as a controlling point for shipping entering and leaving Port Jackson.

A solid sandstone tower with connected watch keepers quarters built in the early 1840s and designed by the Colonial Architect Mortimer Lewis.  The tower is octagonal in plan having four levels and a basement store cut 10 feet into a solid rock. The topmost level has a cantilevered iron and timber catwalk and the metal pitched roof is surmounted by an observation fleche. Decoration is minimal but the form of the shaft with simple stepping, string courses and small panel oval and square windows is typical of restrained Colonial Georgian building work. It was also reported that the government stores already had a catoptric lens apparatus available that has been purchased in 1853.

The wing for staff quarters in an "I" plan with enclosed verandahs either side. This building probably s building having very good ashlar work to external walls with each elevation recessed within a frame of foundation, eaves and quoin mouldings. Windows are marked by simple classical sill and lintel mouldings. The hipped roofs originally of slate are now sheeted in asbestos cement. A good timber picket fence encloses the property which is in good condition and well maintained.

After coming onto the real estate market for the first time, the two-bedroom Cottage One of the Signal Station has been leased on the first inspection, by a young family. The two-bedroom cottage has its own 1795 cannon in the yard. It was built in the 1840s, has a new kitchen and bathroom, and was most recently used as housing for NSW Maritime Services personnel.

The tower construction ended in 1858, and it was the third lighthouse built in New South Wales, following Macquarie Lighthouse in 1818 and Nobbys Head Light in 1858. It was opened by Sir William Denison, Governor of New South Wales, and named after the family of his wife Caroline, daughter of Admiral Sir Phipps Hornby, though it was known as the "Lower Light", to distinguish it from Macquarie Lighthouse, the "Upper Light".

The original apparatus was a first order catoptric lens, and the light source was a kerosene lamp. Also built with the lighthouse was a sandstone keeper's cottage, also designed by Dawson. A second cottage was constructed in 1860, and two rooms were added to each of the cottages in 1877. The cottages were connected to the city water only in 1897, using stored waters until then. In 1904 the light was upgraded to incandescent gas, In 1933 the light was electrified, and the lighthouse was automated and demanned. In 1948 a Chance Brothers catadioptric lens was installed, and the light characteristic was changed to a rhythmic light.

Following the automation of the lighthouse in 1933, the lighthouse and cottages fell into disuse. With World War II the shoreline fell under control of the Army, and remained so until 1977, housing serving married personnel. Following classification by the National Trust in 1975, the army transferred the station to the National Parks and Wildlife Service, which restored the cottages and instated caretakers.

Description 
The site of the first navigational beacon in Australia providing warning to mariners.

A dominant Sydney landmark which appears to have been in continuous use since the 1840s as a controlling point for shipping entering and leaving Port Jackson.

A solid sandstone tower with connected watch keepers quarters built in the early 1840s and designed by the Colonial Architect Mortimer Lewis. The tower is octagonal in plan having four levels and a basement store cut 10 feet into a solid rock. The topmost level has a cantilevered iron and timber catwalk and the metal pitched roof is surmounted by an observation fleche. Decoration is minimal but the form of the shaft with simple stepping, string courses and small panel oval and square windows is typical of restrained Colonial Georgian building work. The wing for staff quarters in an "I" plan with enclosed verandahs either side. This building probably s building having very good ashlar work to external walls with each elevation recessed within a frame of foundation, eaves and quoin mouldings. Windows are marked by simple classical sill and lintel mouldings. The hipped roofs originally of slate are now sheeted in asbestos cement. A good timber picket fence encloses the property which is in good condition and well maintained.

It is painted with distinctive red and white vertical stripes. The sandstone was quarried locally.

On top of the tower is a non-ferrous metal balcony and railing, painted white, surrounded the glass-enclosed lamp.

To the west of the tower are the two Georgian style sandstone cottages, now painted, constructed from the same locally queried sandstone, and having timber verandahs and picket fences. The original slate roofing has been replaced with corrugated asbestos.

Condition 

As at 26 May 1998, A good timber picket fence encloses the property which is in good condition and  well maintained.

Modifications and dates 
The hipped roofs originally of slate are now sheeted in asbestos cement.

Site operation 
The light is operated by the Sydney Ports Corporation, while the site is managed by the National Parks and Wildlife Service as part of the Sydney Harbour National Park. The site is open and accessible to the public, but the tower itself is closed. It can be reached by walking along the South Head Heritage Trail through Sydney Harbour National Park, starting at Camp Cove.

Heritage listing 
Hornby Lighthouse was listed on the New South Wales State Heritage Register on 18 April 2000.

See also 

 List of lighthouses in Australia

Notes

References

Bibliography

Attribution

External links 

 
 
 
  [CC-By-SA]

Lighthouses completed in 1858
Lighthouses in Sydney
1858 establishments in Australia
New South Wales State Heritage Register
New South Wales places listed on the defunct Register of the National Estate
Mortimer Lewis buildings
Watsons Bay, New South Wales
Signal flags
Articles incorporating text from the New South Wales State Heritage Register